Strata is a family of layered casserole dishes in American cuisine.

The most common modern variant is a brunch dish, made from a mixture which mainly consists of bread, eggs and cheese. It may also include meat or vegetables. The usual preparation requires the bread to be layered with the filling in order to produce layers (strata).  It was popularized in the 1984 Silver Palate Good Times Cookbook by Julee Rosso and Sheila Lukins. The first known recipe, the cheese strata, dates back to 1902 and contains bread, white sauce and cheese.

Other recipes merely require that the ingredients are mixed together, like a savory bread pudding. A beaten egg mixture is then poured over the ingredients.  The dish requires a rest of anywhere between one hour and overnight before it is baked. It is served warm.

Cheese strata

The earliest strata recipe known is a 1902 recipe for Cheese strata, a gratin of layers of bread, white sauce, and cheese, but no eggs.

See also

 Lasagna
 List of egg dishes

Notes

Casserole dishes
Egg dishes
Italian-American cuisine
Bread dishes